Cochlostoma is a genus of land snails with an operculum, terrestrial gastropod mollusks in the family Cochlostomatidae.

Distribution 
Calcareous terrains of South Europe and North Africa.

Description and Anatomy 
Mantle caves serve as pulmones. Operculum corneous and multispiral. Penis is oriented above the right tentacle. Sexual dimorphism is often recognisable in external morphology.

Ecology 
All species are confined to limestone habitats, feeding on dead plants and microflora. Females lays large eggs, hatching after three to six weeks.

Species
The genus Cochlostoma contains at least 140 species and subspecies, including:

subgenus Auritus
 Cochlostoma achaicum (O. Boettger, 1885)
 Cochlostoma alleryanum (Paulucci, 1879)
 Cochlostoma auritum (Rossmässler, 1837)
 Cochlostoma fuchsi Feher, 2004
 Cochlostoma georgi (A.J. Wagner, 1906)
 Cochlostoma hellenicum (Saint-Simon, 1869)
 Cochlostoma hoyeri (Polinski, 1922)
 Cochlostoma paladilhianum (Saint-Simon, 1869)
 Cochlostoma parnonis Schütt, 1981
 Cochlostoma pinteri Feher, 2004
 Cochlostoma roseoli (A.J. Wagner, 1901)
 Cochlostoma tessellatum (Rossmässler, 1837)
 Cochlostoma westerlundi (Paulucci, 1879)

subgenus Cochlostoma
 Cochlostoma septemspirale (Razoumowsky, 1789)

subgenus Turritus
 Cochlostoma acutum (Caziot, 1908)
 Cochlostoma adamii (Paulucci, 1879)
 Cochlostoma affine (Benoit, 1882)
 Cochlostoma braueri (A.J. Wagner, 1897)
 Cochlostoma crosseanum (Paulucci, 1879)
 Cochlostoma elegans (Clessin, 1879)
 Cochlostoma euboicum (Westerlund, 1885)
 Cochlostoma gracile (L. Pfeiffer, 1849)
 Cochlostoma kleciaki (Braun, 1887)
 Cochlostoma macei (Bourguignat, 1869)
 Cochlostoma montanum (Issel, 1866)
 Cochlostoma mostarensis (A.J. Wagner, 1906)
 Cochlostoma nanum (Westerlund, 1879)
 Cochlostoma pageti Klemm, 1962
 Cochlostoma patulum (Draparnaud, 1801)
 Cochlostoma sardoum (Westerlund, 1890)
 Cochlostoma simrothi (Caziot, 1908)
 Cochlostoma stossichi (Hirc, 1881)
 Cochlostoma sturanii (A.J. Wagner, 1897)
subgenus Dalfreddia

 Cochlostoma porroi (Strobel, 1850)

 Cochlostoma subalpinum (Pini, 1884)

subgenus Clessiniella

Cochlostoma anomphale Boeckel, 1939
Cochlostoma stelucarum Zallot et al., 2021
Cochlostoma tergestinum (Westerlund, 1878)
 Cochlostoma villae (Strobel, 1851)
 Cochlostoma waldemari (A.J. Wagner, 1897)

subgenus Eupomatias

 Cochlostoma henricae (Strobel, 1851)
 Cochlostoma philippianum (Gredler, 1853)

subgenus Wagneriola

 Cochlostoma scalarinum (A. & J.B. Villa, 1841)

subgenus Lovcenia

 Cochlostoma dalmatinum (L. Pfeiffer, 1863)
 Cochlostoma erika (A.J. Wagner, 1906)
 Cochlostoma jakschae Zallot, Fehér, Bamberger, Gittenberger, 2015
 Cochlostoma lanatum Zallot, Fehér, Bamberger, Gittenberger, 2015
 Cochlostoma tropojanum Zallot, Fehér, Bamberger, Gittenberger, 2015

unknown subgenus

Cochlostoma cinerascens (Rossmässler, 1837)
 Cochlostoma cretense (Maltzan, 1887)

Synonyms of Cochlostoma
 Auritus Westerlund, 1883
 Auritus (Auritus) Westerlund, 1883
 Auritus (Holcopoma) Kobelt & Möllendorff, 1899
 Auritus (Pleuropoma) A. J. Wagner, 1897
 Auritus (Titanopoma) A. J. Wagner, 1897
 Cochlostoma (Auritus) Westerlund, 1883· accepted, alternate representation
 Cochlostoma (Cinerascens) A. J. Wagner, 1897· accepted, alternate representation
 Cochlostoma (Clessiniella) Zallot, Groenenberg, De Mattia, Fehér & E. Gittenberger, 2015 (junior objective synonym)
 Cochlostoma (Cochlostoma) Jan, 1830· accepted, alternate representation
 Cochlostoma (Dalfreddia) Zallot, Groenenberg, De Mattia, Fehér & E. Gittenberger, 2015· accepted, alternate representation
 Cochlostoma (Eupomatias) A. J. Wagner, 1897· accepted, alternate representation
 Cochlostoma (Holcopoma) Kobelt & Möllendorff, 1899
 Cochlostoma (Lovcenia) Zallot, Groenenberg, De Mattia, Fehér & E. Gittenberger, 2015· accepted, alternate representation
 Cochlostoma (Neglecta) A. J. Wagner, 1897· accepted, alternate representation
 Cochlostoma (Scalarina) A. J. Wagner, 1897· accepted, alternate representation
 Cochlostoma (Titanopoma) A. J. Wagner, 1897 (junior synonym)
 Cochlostoma (Turritus) Westerlund, 1883· accepted, alternate representation
 Cyclostoma (Cochlostoma) Jan, 1830 (original rank)
 Diversicolor A. J. Wagner, 1905 (a junior synonym)
 Hartmannia Newton, 1891
 Holcopoma Kobelt & Möllendorff, 1899
 Patuliana Caziot, 1908
 Personatus Westerlund, 1883
 Pleuropoma A. J. Wagner, 1897
 Pleuropomatia Tomlin, 1929
 Pomatias (Atlantica) A. J. Wagner, 1897 (invalid: junior homonym of Atlantica Ancey, 1887)
 Pomatias (Auritus) Westerlund, 1883
 Pomatias (Cinerascens) A. J. Wagner, 1897
 Pomatias (Cisalpina) A. J. Wagner, 1897
 Pomatias (Difficilis) A. J. Wagner, 1897 (invalid:junior objective synonym of Hartmannia)
 Pomatias (Eupomatias) A. J. Wagner, 1897
 Pomatias (Maculatus) Westerlund, 1883
 Pomatias (Nana) A. J. Wagner, 1897 (invalid: junior homonym of Nana Schumacher, 1817)
 Pomatias (Neglecta) A. J. Wagner, 1897
 Pomatias (Personatus) Westerlund, 1883
 Pomatias (Philippiana) A. J. Wagner, 1897
 Pomatias (Pleuropoma) A. J. Wagner, 1897 ( invalid: junior homonym of Pleuropoma Möllendorff, 1893; * * Holcopoma and Pleuropomatia are replacement names)
 Pomatias (Pomatiella) Clessin, 1889
 Pomatias (Sardoa) A. J. Wagner, 1897
 Pomatias (Scalarina) A. J. Wagner, 1897
 Pomatias (Septemspiraliana) Caziot, 1910
 Pomatias (Septemspiralis) A. J. Wagner, 1897
 Pomatias (Strobelia) Clessin, 1889 (invalid: junior homonym of Strobelia Rondani, 1868 [Diptera])
 Pomatias (Tesselata) A. J. Wagner, 1897
 Pomatias (Titanopoma) A. J. Wagner, 1897 (junior objective synonym of Auritus)
 Pomatias (Turritus) Westerlund, 1883
 Stereopoma A. J. Wagner, 1897 (junior synonym)

References
This article incorporates public domain text from reference

External links 
 an, G. (1830). Scientia naturalis cultoribus. Conspectus methodicus Testaceorum in collectione mea exstantium anno 1830. 8 pp. Parma

Gastropod genera
Cyclophoroidea
Taxonomy articles created by Polbot